The Bahraini records in swimming are the fastest ever performances of swimmers from Bahrain, which are recognised and ratified by the Bahrain Swimming Association.

All records were set in finals unless noted otherwise.

Long Course (50 m)

Men

Women

Short Course (25 m)

Men

Women

References

Bahrain
Records
Swimming
Swimming